Rock and Roll's Greatest Failure: Otway the Movie is a 2013 feature-length documentary directed by Steve Barker about English singer-songwriter John Otway.

Story 
Otway is on stage performing Beware of the Flowers (Cos I'm Sure They're Gonna Get You, Yeah) in front of over 20,000 people at an outdoor gig in his hometown of Aylesbury in 1978 before fast-forwarding to 2012 where Otway is giving a talk to students at his old school on how to survive in the music industry. Full of contemporary footage and interviews with key figures throughout Otway's career (including some footage of his mum explaining why she thought Otway's career choice was an odd one to take given his lack of talent), the film charts Otway's many—mostly failed—attempts to get chart success and the fame and fortune that comes with it and how his ever-loyal fanbase helped to get him what he most desired—a second hit.

Explaining how he first achieved success, Otway talks the audience through his performance on the BBC's Old Grey Whistle Test where, keen to make an impression, he jumped onto the amplifier of his guitarist Wild Willy Barrett only for the amp to fall with Otway crashing down onto the box raising the amp with his legs either side crushing his testicles in the process. This act of careless disregard for his own safety led to Otway's single Cor Baby That's Really Free reaching number 27 in the UK Singles Chart and a £250,000 recording contract with Polydor Records. Polydor A&R man Dennis Munday explains that Polydor also signed the Jam around the same time but only paid £6,000.

Following the hit, Otway and various contemporaries explain how he becomes increasingly desperate for a follow-up hit and the ways in which he tried and failed to get back into the charts. From releasing three copies of his single Frightened and Scared without any vocals to only allowing people into a gig if they had purchased a copy of DK50/80 and how on both these occasions he was thwarted by the Musicians' Union. The film then goes on to explain how failure after failure leads to Otway writing his first autobiography Cor Baby That's Really Me: Rock and Roll's Greatest Failure and how this sees a resurrection of his career.

After years in the wilderness, Otway finds himself creeping back into the national consciousness with increasing press coverage, TV appearances and publicity stunts designed to return Otway to the top of the music industry. The film tells how he teams up with guitarist Richard Holgarth, who then gets a band together for Otway's 2,000th gig at the London Astoria. Promoter Paul Clerehugh explains how the band gives Otway all his credibility back whilst Otway goes on to reveal his next big scheme—playing the Royal Albert Hall which is only "twice as big" as the Astoria. Here the film highlights just how limited Otway's musical talent is as he struggles to sing along to the specially commissioned orchestration with his first band—the Aylesbury Youth Orchestra. The only time he gets it right is on the night in front of a sellout crowd—much to his relief. It was also around this time that Otway and his fans embarked on one of their biggest publicity stunts to date. Coming up to the millennium, the BBC conducted a poll to find out what the nation thought were the greatest lyrics of all time. Otway fan Ali Mclean explains how it occurred to him that people voting were likely to vote for a number of different songs by various more successful artists, but if the Otway fans focussed their attention on just one song, they may just have a chance of getting into the top 10. The plan worked, with Beware of the Flowers, Cos I'm Sure They're Gonna Get You, Yeah reaching number seven in the chart

This success inspires Otway and his fans to try to give him what he most desires—a second hit and how retail stores try to prevent Otway from achieving this. Interviewees explain that back in 2002, downloads did not count towards chart position, only sales through the shops. This market was dominated by the big retail chains of Woolworths, Asda, WHSmith and Tesco. If you could not get your single into these stores, you were very unlikely to have a hit. Sadly for Otway, none of these stores would take the single. However, an orchestrated fan campaign saw Bunsen Burner reach number nine in the UK Charts. It is then revealed that despite this success and an appearance on the BBC's flagship music programme Top of the Pops, Woolworths still refuse to stock Otway's single and place their own choice of number nine in their displays. The audience also find out how Otway's Hit campaign inspires Jon Morter to try to get Rage Against the Machine the coveted Christmas number one in 2009.

Otway explains how the success of Bunsen Burner goes to his head and he embarks on putting together an ambitious world tour. Otway explains his ambition to do the "greatest world tour ever" and charters his own jet to take him, his band and 300 fans to places like New York City, Las Vegas, Tahiti and Sydney. He also explains how he puts a £10,000 deposit down on hiring the large concert hall at the Sydney Opera House, which although expensive is still "significantly cheaper than hiring a jet". He also explains how contemporary artists such as Glenn Tilbrook and Steve Harley agree to come on the tour with him. Sadly, after initial enthusiasm for the world tour subsides, Otway is left with little choice but to cancel the tour as costs spiral and only half the plane is filled.

Coming up to his 60th birthday in 2012, Otway announces he intends to produce and show a movie of career. The film thus ends on a high with Otway triumphantly walking along the red carpet in scenes shot on the morning of the producers' premiere. He explains how the movie has been paid for by his fans snapping up tickets for a screening at London's Odeon Leicester Square all of whom are credited as producers in the film's closing credits.

Producers' premiere
To celebrate his 60th birthday, Otway booked the Odeon Leicester Square to screen the story of his career to his fans. The screening created cinematic history with the final scenes being filmed from the red carpet on the morning of the Producers' Premiere and cut into the movie whilst the producers were watching the film. Over 1,000 fans packed into the Odeon to watch the screening of their idol each of whom were credited as a producer in the film's end credits. The movie was hailed a great success by those who attended the Premiere.

Cannes Film Festival
In May 2013, after further editing, Otway took the film and a group of his fans to the Cannes Film Festival for the film's international debut. In order to promote the screening of the movie, Otway's fans dressed up as their hero, donned Otway masks and marched down the Croisette before gathering on the red carpet.

Theatrical release
Following the film's success in Cannes, the movie got its theatrical release in June 2013 at Glastonbury Festival and is being shown in selected UK cinemas throughout the summer. The film has received positive reviews and has been hailed by critics as warm, engaging and an enjoyable watch.

References

External links
 
 

Rockumentaries
British documentary films
2013 films
2010s English-language films
2010s British films